Todd William Lyght (born February 9, 1969) is a former professional American football player and former defensive backs coach for the Notre Dame Fighting Irish.

Lyght played in the NFL for 12 seasons from 1991 to 2002, finishing with 37 interceptions and 4 touchdowns. His best year as a pro came during the 1999 season with the Super Bowl champion St. Louis Rams, with whom he intercepted six passes for 112 yards and one touchdown and was named to the 1999 All-Pro and Pro Bowl teams.

Early years 
Born in Kwajalein, Marshall Islands, Lyght attended Powers Catholic High School in Flint, Michigan where he lettered twice as a wide receiver and cornerback.  As a senior, he served as a team captain and caught 38 passes for 877 yards with nine touchdowns, and also intercepted 19 passes. Lyght also lettered three times in track and field. His high school coach, Todd Tucker, claimed that Lyght was cut from freshman football. This was stated during a Power's Catholic High School pep-rally in 1996.

College career 
Lyght played collegiate football for the University of Notre Dame, where he was a two-time consensus All-American (1989 and 1990).  He was a three-year starter at cornerback and was voted as a team captain his senior season.

He had more playing time in 1987 than any other freshman, making 29 tackles, causing one fumble, breaking up two passes and making one interception. Lyght was named a starter for his sophomore season, and led team in tackles in the 1989 Fiesta Bowl win over West Virginia. That victory capped an undefeated season for Notre Dame, leading to a #1 ranking in both the AP and coach's polls. As a result, the 1988 Notre Dame Fighting Irish football team was named the consensus national champion.

As a junior in 1989, he intercepted eight passes (two shy of  school record)  and registered 47 total tackles (27 solo). He ranked eighth in final NCAA standings in 1989 for interceptions and was a finalist for 1989 Jim Thorpe Award. Lyght finished his college career with 161 tackles; caused one fumble; broke up 20.5 passes; had 11 interceptions for 55 return yards and one touchdown. He also played in 1991 Hula Bowl.

Professional career

Pre-draft
Lyght was considered to be among the top players available in the 1991 NFL Draft. He measured 6-foot and 185-pounds and ran a 4.45-second 40-yard dash in pre-draft workouts, and was considered by some to be the best athlete available.  Rams defensive coordinator Jeff Fisher had Lyght rated as the top defensive player in the draft.

Los Angeles/St. Louis Rams
Lyght was a first-round pick, fifth overall, of the Los Angeles Rams in the 1991 NFL Draft.  He was the second cornerback drafted, following third overall pick Bruce Pickens. On August 16, 1991, after a training camp holdout, Lyght signed a five-year $5.6 million deal that made him the second-highest paid player on the Rams. As a rookie in 1991, Lyght started the last eight games of the season at left cornerback after battling several early-season injuries. In 1992, he missed four games after dislocating his shoulder versus Miami On September 20. He was named the NFC Defensive Player of Week after posting nine tackles and two interceptions against the New England Patriots on September 13. In 1993, Lyght tied for team lead with two interceptions but suffered a knee injury in pregame drills on November 21 and was subsequently placed on injured reserve.

In 1994, he made most of first injury-free season; was fourth on team with 84 tackles (72 solo) and led team with 14 passes defensed. He scored the Rams first touchdown of season with 74-yard fumble return against the Arizona Cardinals on September 4. In 1995 the Rams moved to St. Louis, where he started 16 games at left cornerback and finished second on the team with a then-career-high of four interceptions.

On April 14, 1996, Lyght signed a new five-year $10.5 million contract with $4 million guaranteed in bonus and salary. That season Lyght established career-highs in tackles (105), interceptions (5) and pass breakups (19) and added 10 special teams tackles. In 1997, he started all 16 games at cornerback and participated on special teams; he finished third on team in tackles with 107 and second in passes defensed with 23, along  with  four  interceptions, one sack, two forced fumbles and two fumble recoveries. The next season, 1998, he again started all 16 games at left corner and played on special teams finishing fifth on team in tackles with 87, first in  pass defensed with 20, along with three interceptions, 1½ sacks, and three forced fumbles.

In 1999 Lyght earned his first Pro Bowl selection and was a first-team All-Pro as well. He recorded 65 tackles and had 6 interceptions, 2½ sacks, 15 passes defensed and one forced fumble. He scored his fourth career touchdown on a 57-yard interception return versus the Carolina Panthers on November 14, 1999. He also recorded 22 tackles, had one interception and deflected 5 passes in the playoffs as the Rams went on to win Super Bowl XXXIV. He also blocked a field goal attempt in the Super Bowl.

Detroit Lions
On April 12, 2001, Lyght signed a two-year $2.5 million contract with the Detroit Lions. He had a fine season with the Lions in 2001, starting 16 games and making 59 tackles and intercepting four passes, one he returned for a touchdown. In 2002, he played in 16 games and started 14, making 99 tackles and picking off two passes. On December 29, 2002, Lyght set an NFL record for being the oldest player to return a blocked field goal for a touchdown (33 years, 323 days). It was the sixth defensive touchdown in Lyght's career (along with four touchdowns off of interceptions and one from a fumble recovery).

Lyght retired from the NFL following the 2002 season.

Statistics

Coaching career
Lyght began a career in coaching in 2009, following several years of working in private business and as a football analyst on radio. His first position was as an assistant football coach at Bishop Gorman High School in Summerlin, Nevada on the staff of head coach Tony Sanchez.  While on staff, the team won back-to-back state championships in 2009 and 2010.

In 2011, Lyght joined the staff at the University of Oregon as a defensive intern under head coach Chip Kelly.  Lyght was initially contacted about the open position by Ducks defensive coordinator Nick Aliotti, who happened to be an assistant coach with the Rams during Lyght's playing days.

Lyght was named assistant defensive backs coach for the Philadelphia Eagles of the NFL in 2013.  The hiring reunited him with Eagles head coach Chip Kelly, who had departed Oregon for the Eagles following the 2012 season.

Following the 2014 season, Lyght was hired by Vanderbilt to be their cornerbacks coach.

In February 2015, Lyght was hired by the University of Notre Dame to replace Kerry Cooks as defensive backs coach. During his tenure as an assistant coach at Notre Dame, the Irish had a record of 47-17.  In January 2021 Notre Dame football was placed on probation for one year over recruiting violations due to Lyght having impermissible contact with a player at his high school and also sending 10 impermissible text messages to a 2021 recruit before it was allowed under NCAA rules.

Personal life
Lyght established a series of scholarships at St. Mary's Elementary (Alexandria, Virginia), Powers Catholic High School, and   the University of Notre Dame. In 1995, he donated $50,000 to the United Negro College Fund as part of NFL's Golden Circle.

References

1969 births
Living people
African-American players of American football
All-American college football players
American football cornerbacks
Detroit Lions players
High school football coaches in Nevada
Los Angeles Rams players
National Conference Pro Bowl players
Notre Dame Fighting Irish football coaches
Notre Dame Fighting Irish football players
Oregon Ducks football coaches
People from the Ralik Chain
Philadelphia Eagles coaches
Players of American football from Flint, Michigan
St. Louis Rams players
Vanderbilt Commodores football coaches